SP-21  is a state highway in the state of São Paulo in Brazil. It's also known as Rodoanel Mário Covas.

References

Highways in São Paulo (state)

pt:SP-21